Moreauville is a village in Avoyelles Parish, Louisiana, United States. The population was 929 at the 2010 census.

Geography
Moreauville is located at  (31.038998, -91.976067).

Demographics

2020 census

As of the 2020 United States census, there were 984 people, 416 households, and 255 families residing in the village.

2000 census
As of the census of 2000, there were 922 people, 373 households, and 243 families residing in the village. The racial makeup of the village was 61.17% White, 35.68% African American, 1.74% Native American, 0.65% from other races, and 0.76% from two or more races. Hispanic or Latino of any race were 0.54% of the population.

There were 373 households, out of which 33.2% had children under the age of 18 living with them, 49.1% were married couples living together, 12.9% had a female householder with no husband present, and 34.6% were non-families. 31.9% of all households were made up of individuals, and 20.1% had someone living alone who was 65 years of age or older. The average household size was 2.46 and the average family size was 3.14.

In the village, the population was spread out, with 27.4% under the age of 18, 7.9% from 18 to 24, 25.5% from 25 to 44, 20.2% from 45 to 64, and 19.0% who were 65 years of age or older. The median age was 37 years. For every 100 females, there were 88.9 males. For every 100 females age 18 and over, there were 81.8 males.

The median income for a household in the village was $28,942, and the median income for a family was $36,696. Males had a median income of $25,500 versus $16,406 for females. The per capita income for the village was $12,078. About 11.7% of families and 17.2% of the population were below the poverty line, including 14.8% of those under age 18 and 19.1% of those age 65 or over.

Government

On October 13, 2014 Moreauville passed a ban on several breeds of dogs, including Rottweilers and pit bulls. According to Penn Lemoine, a village alderperson, several Moreauville residents had complained that dogs from those breeds "were basically running along town" and that made the persons unable to "walk along the neighborhoods". Owners would have had to give up the dogs by December 1 of that year. The law stated that all banned dogs not removed would be seized and taken for "disposition" by that day. O'Hara Owens, a village resident and the owner of a pit bull, criticized the law. After the story gained widespread attention, the village government "reconsidered" the law, and abandoned the December 1 deadline.

References

Villages in Avoyelles Parish, Louisiana
Villages in Louisiana